The women's 100 metres event at the 2015 Military World Games was held on 6 October at the KAFAC Sports Complex.

Records
Prior to this competition, the existing world and CISM record were as follows:

Schedule

Medalists

Results

Round 1
Qualification: First 3 in each heat (Q) and next 2 fastest (q) qualified for the final.

Wind:Heat 1: -1.1 m/s, Heat 2: -0.3 m/s

Final
Wind: +1.6 m/s

References

100
2015 in women's athletics
2015